Zulia was one of three s of the Venezuelan Navy.  Named for the Venezuelan state of Zulia, it was built by the British shipyard Vickers Armstrong in the 1950s. It served as the leader of the 2nd Destroyer Division, and remained in service until 1978.

Design and description
In 1950, the Venezuelan Navy placed an order for two large destroyers,  and Zulia, with the British shipbuilding company Vickers Armstrong, with an order for a third ship, following later. The ships was of similar size and layout to the British Daring-class destroyers, but carried the same gun mounts as the older and smaller , and was often compared with the Battles.

Displacement was  standard and  full load.

Main gun armament consisted of three twin QF Mark IV  mounts, with two forward and one mount aft, with a close-in armament of 16 40mm Bofors guns in eight twin mounts. Torpedo armament consisted of a single triple mount for 21-inch (533 mm) torpedoes, while 30 depth charges could be carried. The ship had a crew of 18 officers and 236 other ranks.

Construction and career
Zulia was laid down at Vickers Armstrong's Barrow-in-Furness shipyard on 24 July 1951, was launched on 29 June 1952 and completed on 15 September 1954. Zulia was refitted at Vickers Armstrong's Hebburn shipyard in 1959, where the ship's torpedo tubes were removed to accommodate two Squid anti-submarine mortars. In 1960, the ship was fitted with modernised electronics at the New York Navy Yard.

Citations

References

External links 
 A picture of D-21 Zulia The Iron Destroyer

Nueva Esparta-class destroyers
1953 ships
Ships built by Vickers Armstrong